Philippe Coenjaerts (born 18 April 1903, date of death unknown) was a Belgian sprinter. He competed in the men's 4 × 400 metres relay at the 1928 Summer Olympics.

References

1903 births
Year of death missing
Athletes (track and field) at the 1928 Summer Olympics
Belgian male sprinters
Belgian male middle-distance runners
Olympic athletes of Belgium
Place of birth missing